Martin le Franc ( – 1461) was a French poet of the late Middle Ages and early Renaissance.

Life and career
He was born in Normandy, and studied in Paris. He entered clerical orders, becoming an apostolic prothonotary, and later becoming secretary to both Antipope Felix V and Pope Nicholas V.

He was named provost at Lausanne in 1443, and became canon of the Church of Geneva in 1447. In 1451 he was employed by the Duke of Savoy, and he became administrator of the abbey of Novalèse in 1459.

Le Franc's most famous work was his huge, 24,000-verse composition Le Champion des Dames (The Champion of Women), dedicated to Philip the Good and dating from 1440 or 1442 (first printed in Lyon in 1485 and again in Paris in 1530). It recounts the nobility and deeds of many women throughout history, including Joan of Arc, and also fiercely attacks corruption in government as well as the hedonistic luxury of the aristocratic class. It was illuminated by Peronet Lamy. 

Martin le Franc is famous in music history for penning the phrase "la contenance angloise", the English countenance, a much-debated phrase referring to a characteristically English sound found in the music of composers such as John Dunstaple. The "countenance" — probably consonant, sweet intervals (3rds and 6ths) which were predominant in the music of contemporary English composers — was massively influential on the music of the Burgundian School during the period that Burgundy was allied with England.

Another long poem by Le Franc is L'Estrif de Fortune et Vertu (1447–1448), which was also moralistic and didactic, presenting a debate between Fortune and Virtue.

Works
Le Franc, Martin. The Trial of Womankind: A Rhyming Translation of Book IV of the Fifteenth-Century Le Champion des Dames. Ed. and trans. Steven Millen Taylor. Jefferson, NC: McFarland & Co., 2005.
Le Franc, Martin. The Conception of Mary -- A Rhyming Translation of Book V of Le Champion des Dames by Martin Le Franc (1410-1461). Ed. and trans. Steven Millen Taylor. Lewiston, NY: Edwin Mellen Press, 2010.

Sources
 
  

1410 births
1461 deaths
Writers from Normandy
French poets
Apostolic pronotaries